Robinsonia fogra is a moth in the family Erebidae. It was described by William Schaus in 1895. It is found in French Guiana, Brazil and Venezuela.

References

Moths described in 1895
Robinsonia (moth)